Demineralized freeze dried bone allograft, referred to as DFDBA, is a bone graft material known for its de novo bone formation properties.  It is used extensively in bone grafting of alveolar bone in oral and periodontal surgery.

References

Dentistry terminology
Skeletal system